Maia Ramsfjell (born 30 April 1999 in Oslo) is a Norwegian curler.

At the national level, she is a three-time Norwegian women's champion, one-time Norwegian mixed champion and two-time Norwegian mixed doubles champion curler.

Teams

Women's

Mixed

Mixed doubles

Personal life
Ramsfjell is the daughter of three-time world champion and Olympic bronze medalist Eigil Ramsfjell and nephew of Olympic champion Bent Ramsfjell. Her brother is Norwegian curler Magnus Ramsfjell.

References

External links

Ramsfjell, Maia | Nordic Junior Curling Tour
Player profile - 2016 Winter Youth Olympics (web archive)
 Video:
 
 

Living people
1999 births
Sportspeople from Oslo
Norwegian female curlers
Norwegian curling champions
Curlers at the 2016 Winter Youth Olympics